The Hailey Shales Formation is a geologic formation in Wyoming. It preserves fossils dating back to the Cretaceous period.Plesiopleurodon was found in this formation.

See also

 List of fossiliferous stratigraphic units in Wyoming
 Paleontology in Wyoming

References
 

Geologic formations of Wyoming
Cretaceous System of North America